A Master of Science in Administration degree (abbreviated MScA or MSA) is a type of Master of Science degree awarded by universities in many countries. It is a relatively new field of study that came into existence in the mid-to-late 1970s. The MSA provides preparation for a variety of administrative positions in large, mid-sized and small organizations. The focus of the MSA program highlights the importance of management skills and is designed to develop and train management graduates who may serve in the private or public sector.  

The MSA program is a branch of the Master of Public Administration (MPA) and Master of Business Administration (MBA). The MSA combines courses from several courses, including psychology, economics, political science, statistics, leadership, computer science, business administration, technology and resource management.  The MSA has similarities to the MPA, as it focuses on organizational behavior, microeconomics, public finance, research methods/statistics, policy process and policy analysis, ethics, public management, leadership, planning and GIS, and program evaluation/performance measurement.  The similarities with the MBA include the focus on economics, organizational behavior, marketing, accounting, finance, strategy, operations management, international business, information technology management, supply chain management, project management, government policy, and ethics. 

Universities that currently offer this degree include
Boston College
Boston University
California State University Bakersfield
California State University Los Angeles
California State University San Marcos
Central Michigan University
Saginaw Valley State University
Arizona State University
Northern Arizona University
Lindenwood University
Lincoln University of Pennsylvania
Missouri State University
Pepperdine University
Saint Michael's College, Vermont
Trinity University, Washington, D.C.
University of South Dakota
University of West Florida
Andrews University
Université Laval, Québec, Canada
HEC Montréal
West Chester University of Pennsylvania
Albanian University, Tirana, Albania
University of North Carolina Greensboro Greensboro, NC

University of West Florida Pensacola, FL
University of South Dakota Vermillion, SD
University of Wisconsin–Milwaukee Milwaukee, WI
Siena College, Albany, NY
Southern Adventist University, Collegedale, Tennessee
 Union College, Barbourville, Kentucky 

Administration